Constantin Brâncoveanu (1654 – August 15, 1714) was Prince of Wallachia between 1688 and 1714.

Biography

Ascension
A descendant of the Craiovești boyar family and heir through his grandfather Preda of a considerable part of Matei Basarab′s fortune, Brâncoveanu was born on the estate of Brâncoveni and raised in the house of his uncle, stolnic Constantin Cantacuzino. He rose to the throne after the death of his uncle, prince Şerban Cantacuzino. He was initially supported by his maternal uncles Constantin and Mihai Cantacuzino, but grew increasingly independent from them in the course of his reign. Constantin Cantacuzino retreated to one of his estates and began advocating his son Ștefan's candidacy to the throne.

Policies
The prince took steps in negotiating anti-Ottoman alliances first with the Habsburg monarchy, and then with Peter the Great's Russia (see Russo-Turkish War, 1710-1711): upon the 1710 Russian intervention in Moldavia, the prince contacted Tsar Peter and accepted gifts from the latter, while his rivalry with the Moldavian Prince Dimitrie Cantemir (the main regional ally of the Russians) prevented a more decisive political move. Instead, Brâncoveanu gathered Wallachian troops in Urlați, near the Moldavian border, awaiting for Russian troops to storm into his country and offer his services to the tsar, while also readying to join the Ottoman counter-offensive in the event of a change in fortunes. When several of his boyars fled to the Russian camp, the prince saw himself forced to decide in favor of the Ottomans or risk becoming an enemy of his Ottoman suzerain, and swiftly returned the gifts he had received from the Russians.

Arrest and execution
Such policies were eventually denounced to the Porte. Brâncoveanu was deposed from his throne by Sultan Ahmed III, and brought under arrest to Istanbul, where he was imprisoned in 1714 at the fortress of Yedikule (the Seven Towers).

There he was tortured by the Ottomans, who hoped to locate the immense fortune he had supposedly amassed. He and his four sons were beheaded on the same day in August, together with Prince Constantin's faithful friend, grand treasurer Enache Văcărescu. Most importantly, Constantin and his sons were asked to renounce Christianity and join the Islamic religion, which would pardon them from beheading. They chose to keep their Christian faith.

According to his secretary, Anton Maria Del Chiaro, their heads were then carried on poles through the streets of Istanbul, an episode which caused a great unrest in the city. Fearing a rebellion, including from that of the Muslim population which was outraged by the injustice done to the Prince, his sons and his close friend, he ordered for the bodies to be thrown into the Bosporus. Christian fishermen took the bodies from the water, and buried them at the Halchi Monastery, in the city's vicinity.

Death and sanctification in Eastern Orthodoxy
The circumstances and facts of Constantin's death are recorded in history, and his sanctification is recognized by all Eastern Orthodox Churches.

On 15 August 1714, the Feast of the Dormition, when Constantin Brâncoveanu was also celebrating his 60th birthday, he and his four sons and boyar Ianache Văcărescu were brought before Sultan Ahmed III of Turkey. Diplomatic representatives of Austria, Russia, France and England were also present. After all of his fortune has been seized, in exchange for the life of his family he was asked to renounce the Orthodox Christian faith. He reportedly said: "Behold, all my fortunes and all I had, I have lost! Let us not lose our souls. Be brave and manly, my beloved! Ignore death. Look at how much Christ, our Savior, has endured for us and with what shameful death he died. Firmly believe in this and do not move, nor leave your faith for this life and this world." After this, his four sons, Constantin, Ștefan, Radu and Matei and advisor Ianache were beheaded in front of their father.

History also that the smallest child, Matei (12 years old) was so frightened after seeing the bloodbath and the heads of his three brothers that he started crying and asking his father to let him renounce Christianity and convert to Islam. At that moment, Constantin Brâncoveanu said: "Of our kind none have lost their faith. It is better to die a thousand times than to leave your ancient faith just to live few more years on earth." Matei listened and offered his head. After Brâncoveanu himself was decapitated, their heads were impaled on javelins and displayed in a procession. Their bodies were left before the gate and later on thrown into the waters of the Bosphorus.

Cultural contribution
Brâncoveanu was a great patron of culture, his achievements being part of the Romanian and world cultural heritage. Under his reign, many Romanian, Greek, Bulgarian, Arabic, Turkish, and Georgian texts were printed after a printing press was established in Bucharest - an institution overseen by Anthim the Iberian. In 1694, he founded the Royal Academy of Bucharest.

In his religious and laic constructions, Brâncoveanu harmoniously combined in architecture the mural and sculptural painting, the local tradition, the Neo-Byzantine style and the innovative ideas of the Italian Renaissance, giving rise to Brâncovenesc style. The most accomplished and the best preserved example of Brâncovenesc style architecture is Hurezi monastery, inscribed by UNESCO on its list of World Heritage Sites, where Brâncoveanu intended to have his tomb. Other buildings built by him are Mogoşoaia Palace complex, Potlogi Palace, Brâncoveanu monastery. Such cultural ventures relied on increased taxation, which was also determined by the mounting fiscal pressure of the Ottomans (adding in turn to Brâncoveanu's determination to strip Wallachia of Turkish rule).

Legacy

Brâncoveanu left to the secular Romanian spirituality a few fundamental books, printed for the first time in Wallachia; among them, Aristotle's Ethics, the Flower of the Gifts and the Philosophical Examples, the last two being translated and printed by Antim Ivireanul. 
The neo-Romanian style was born from the style of the monasteries, of the houses and of the palaces of Brâncoveanu and it became, through Ion Mincu and his school, the national style at the time of the affirmation of the cultural identities of the nations of Europe in the beginning of the 20th century.

The architectural Brâncovenesc style is found in the churches of the Monasteries of Hurezi, Râmnicu Sarat, Doicesti and New St. George Church in Bucharest. Among secular buildings, the style can be found in Mogosoaia palace and the reworked Old Court. The Brâncovenesc style was revived in the 20th century in form of the Romanian Revival style, also called "Neo-Brâncovenesc".

The Constantin Brâncoveanu University is located in Pitești, but it also has subsidiaries in Brăila and Râmnicu Vâlcea.

In June 1992, the Sinode of the Romanian Orthodox Church decreed the sanctification of Constantin Brâncoveanu, his sons Constantin, Radu, Ștefan and Matei, and vornic Ianache Văcărescu. On March 7, 2018, the decision of the Holy Synod of the Russian Orthodox Church added these saints to the calendar of the Russian Orthodox Church. On 16 August 2020, Romania celebrated for the first time the day of remembrance of the persecution of Christians in the world. Although Brâncoveanu died on 15 August, his death was also remembered for having refused to convert to Islam.

Historiography

The intrigue marking Constantin's ascension and reign is reflected in chronicles of the time, which are ideologically divided: Letopisețul Cantacuzinesc gives a bleak account of Șerban's rule, as does Cronica Bălenilor; Radu Greceanu's is an official account of Brâncoveanu's rule, and Radu Popescu is adverse to Cantacuzino rulers.

Dimitrie Cantemir's Historia Hieroglyphica is centered on the clash, and reflects Cantemir's preference for Constantin Cantacuzino, who was also related to Dimitrie through marriage (despite the fact that Cantemir and Brâncoveanu have taken the same side in the conflict with the Porte).

Ștefan Cantacuzino's brief rule saw in turn the downfall of the Cantacuzinos; he and his father were executed by the Ottomans, who saw the solution to the risk of Wallacho-Russian alliances in imposing the rigid system of Phanariote rule (inaugurated in Wallachia by Nicholas Mavrocordato, who, through his previous rule in Moldavia, is also considered the first Phanariote in that country).

Through his death, Constantin Brâncoveanu became the hero of a series Romanian folk ballads, as well as being depicted on some of Romania's official coinage. According to the Romanian Orthodox Church, the reason for his and his sons' execution was their refusal to give up their Christian faith and convert to Islam. In 1992 the Church declared him, his sons, and Enache saints and martyrs (Sfinții Martiri Binecredinciosul Voievod Constantin Brâncoveanu, împreună cu fiii săi Constantin, Ștefan, Radu, Matei și sfetnicul Ianache - "The Martyr Saints the Right-Believing Voivode Constantin Brâncoveanu, together with his sons Constantin, Ștefan, Radu, Matei, and the counselor [Enache]"). Their feast day is August 16.

Quotes
Letopisețul Cantacuzinesc on Constantin Brâncoveanu's relations with the Habsburgs and Ottomans early in his reign (1690, during the latter stages of the Great Turkish War):

Issue 

Brâncoveanu and his wife Marica had seven daughters and four sons. Although all of his sons were murdered, many of his daughters had issue. Brâncoveanu's first born, Constantin II, also had a son who survived exile and rose to be a mare ban (foremost state function in Wallachian political hierarchy, except for the ruler). The male line of the Brâncoveanu family became extinguished in 1832, when Grigore Brâncoveanu died without having any children of his own. Yet he adopted a relative (who was also a descendant of Constantin Brâncoveanu) and thus passed the family name on.

According to a genealogical study, roughly 250 of his bloodline were alive at the middle of the 19th century. Amongst them Gheorghe Bibescu and Barbu Știrbei (rulers of Wallachia and Moldova), famous revolutionary Alexandru Ipsilanti, Romanian Prime ministers Barbu Catargiu, Nicolae Kretzulescu, George Manu and Gheorghe Grigore Cantacuzino  "Nababul" and historians Dan and Mihnea Berindei.

Notes

Bibliography 

 

 

 
 
 
 
 
 
 
 
  Estras din Analele Academieĭ Române. Seria II. Tom XXI

External links
  M. Brancoveni
  Manastirea Brancoveni
  
 Anton Maria Del Chiaro, Revoluțiile Valahiei
 Letopisețul Cantacuzinesc (in antiquated Romanian)
 Official Orthodox Church biography (in Romanian)
 Wallachian coinage issued under Constantin Brâncoveanu
 A lease issued by the Prince, bearing his signature and seal

1654 births
1714 deaths
People from Olt County
Executed monarchs
People executed by the Ottoman Empire by decapitation
Princes of the Holy Roman Empire
Romanian saints
Rulers of Wallachia
Patrons of literature
Eastern Orthodox Christians from Romania
Executed Romanian people
Christians executed for refusing to convert to Islam
18th-century Christian saints
18th-century Eastern Orthodox martyrs
17th-century Romanian people
18th-century Romanian people
18th-century executions by the Ottoman Empire
Christian saints killed by Muslims
Craiovești